Flow Tribe is an American funk rock band based in New Orleans, Louisiana. The group contains six members who are all natives of New Orleans.  The band was founded in 2004, and was featured on Episode 11 of MTV's The Real World: New Orleans, which aired September 8, 2010. Sahar Dika, a member of The Real World: New Orleans cast, sang three songs with the band at a concert at Tipitina's. Flow Tribe continues to be a festival favorite playing The Voodoo Music Experience several times including the massive Main Stage.  Flow Tribe has played the New Orleans Jazz and Heritage Festival 5 years running including the Acura Main Stage in 2014 and 2015.  The band also plays several festivals all over the US and tours nationally. Flow Tribe, known for their high energy live show brings their traveling street parade with them to every concert. Relix Magazine called Flow Tribe “bizarrely irresistible.”

Formation

Flow Tribe formed in 2004 as a project between high school friends. Chad Penot's back porch served as the bands makeshift rehearsal space in the early stages of the band. After high school graduation arrived the boys went their separate ways, and the musical project was shelved.

Two years later Hurricane Katrina drew the members back to New Orleans to help rebuild, and in the midst of the destruction of the disaster the band was revived. "At the time, there were a lot of questions in the news," John-Michael Early remembers. "People were saying, 'Is it worth rebuilding New Orleans? Should we send all this money to a city if a disaster might happen again?' There was a big debate going on about the importance of New Orleans. We thought about our love of the city's music, the history, the culture. We were just a bunch of 18 and 19-year old kids, rebuilding our parents' houses during the summer... and we knew the only way we could contribute on a bigger level was with music."

Eager to be ambassadors for a city that hadn't lost any ounce of its spirit during the flood, Flow Tribe re-tooled and hit the road, playing shows for music fans and displaced Katrina survivors throughout the Southeast. As their touring took them further and further away from Louisiana, they saw the love and appreciation that Americans had for the culture of New Orleans. They also learned that one of the most New Orleans-ish aspects of Flow Tribe's sound — the combination of different styles, sounds and genres into the same melting pot — appealed just as much to people who'd never visited the Big Easy. After all, Flow Tribe's genre-spanning "backbone-cracking music" had a little bit of something for everyone.

Current members

 K.C. O'Rorke – vocals, trumpet
 John-Michael Early – harmonica, vocals, keyboard, and washboard
 Russell Olschner – drums
 Chad Penot – bass, vocals
 Bryan Santos – guitar
 Mario Palmisano – guitar

Discography

 Boss (2017)
 Alligator White (2014)
 At Capacity Live: Live at Tipitina’s (2013)
 Pain Killer (2012)
 Pregnant With A Baby Called Funk (2008)

References

External links
 http://www.FlowTribe.com
 http://www.realworlddailies.com/Video/Vibing-with-FloTribe/092ECFFFF00A1312F001B010FDBC4
 https://web.archive.org/web/20110109074906/http://tipitinas.com/content/artist.asp?id=flowtribe
 http://www.whereyat.com/index.php?option=com_content&view=article&id=788&Itemid=488
 https://web.archive.org/web/20080705033528/http://tigerweekly.com/article/04-23-2008/8301

American funk musical groups
Musical groups from New Orleans